Mohamed Tayeb Benouis (27 November 1948 – 9 August 2007) was an Algerian aviator and business executive who served as the director general of Air Algérie, the national airline of Algeria, from 2001 to 2007.

A native of Algiers, Tayeb Benouis was initially the pilot of Algeria's presidential plane, before being named, in 1999, the interim director of Air Algérie and, two years later, its top executive officer. During his term, he presided over one of the most prominent periods of growth and renewal in the airline's history. In particular, he oversaw the inauguration of several new international routes, including the final one he was able to supervise personally, Algiers–Montreal, raising Air Algérie's standing among international air carriers. Another of his top concerns was the revitalization of Air Algérie's fleet. Under his leadership, the enterprise, through its domestic and international networks, had been transporting annually more than three million passengers and 20,000 tons of freight, while serving 25 countries and realizing, in 2005, a sales turnover of 48.7 billion dinars, a growth of 5% compared to 2004, and net revenue increase of 8 billion dinars. Following his official installation as chief executive officer in 2001, Tayeb Benouis launched a bond drive to restore the airline's depleted financial resources and to finance its program of acquisition of fourteen aircraft, namely six ATR, five Airbus and three Boeing between 2003 and 2005.

Mohamed Tayeb Benouis died in a Parisian hospital at the age of 58, following a lengthy illness.

External links
The death of Mohamed Tayeb Benouis as reported by algerie-dz.com
Air Algérie website

Algerian chief executives
Algerian businesspeople
Air Algérie
Businesspeople in aviation
People from Algiers
1948 births
2007 deaths
Non-profit executives
Algerian aviators
20th-century businesspeople
21st-century Algerian people